Frank Kelly (7 August 1950 – 5 June 2006) was  a former Australian rules footballer who played with Richmond in the Victorian Football League (VFL).

Notes

External links 
		

1950 births
2006 deaths
Australian rules footballers from Victoria (Australia)
Richmond Football Club players